Tung Chung Catholic School is a co-educational Chinese school located at Yat Tung, Hong Kong. The school offers primary and secondary education.

History 
The school opened in 2000. There are currently 1686 pupils in the primary and middle schools, taught by 143 teachers. There are an additional 81 teachers in the secondary school.

References

External links

Roman Catholic primary schools in Hong Kong
Catholic secondary schools in Hong Kong
Tung Chung

2000 establishments in Hong Kong
Educational institutions established in 2000